Noche de chicas is a Mexican thriller streaming television miniseries created by Javier Naya and Sergio Cánovas. The series follows a group of friends who take revenge on sexual abusers. It stars Aislinn Derbez, María León, Leticia Dolera, Silvia Alonso and Paula Usero.

It premiered on Vix+ on 24 February 2023.

Cast

Main 
 Aislinn Derbez as Tess
 Perla Cerezo as Young Tess
 María León as Lola
 Veki Velilla as Young Lola
 Leticia Dolera as Elena
 Lucía Alonso as Young Elena
 Silvia Alonso as Laura
 Lucía de la Fuente as Young Laura
 Paula Usero as Kira
 Zöe Millán as Young Kira

Recurring and guest stars 
 César Mateo as Carlos
 Mateo Franco as Diego
 Iñigo Galiano as Luis
 María Martinez as Sophie
 Elena Martín as Matilde
 José Antonio-López Vilariño as Agent Soto
 Raúl Rivera as Agent Navarro
 Rubén de Eguia as Mario
 Jorge Silvestre as Dani
 Juan Carlos Martín as Judge Segarra

Episodes

References

External links 
 

2020s Mexican television series
2023 Mexican television series debuts
2023 Mexican television series endings
Spanish-language television shows
Vix (streaming service) original programming